Rasipuram was a Lok Sabha constituency in Tamil Nadu. After delimitation in 2009, it is now defunct. The area is now a part of the Namakkal (Lok Sabha constituency).

Assembly segments
Rasipuram Lok Sabha constituency was composed of the following assembly segments:
Chinnasalem (defunct)
Attur  (moved to Kallakurichi constituency after 2009)
Talavasal (SC) (defunct)
Rasipuram (moved to Namakkal constituency after 2009)
Sendamangalam (ST) (moved to Namakkal constituency after 2009)
Namakkal (SC)  (moved to Namakkal constituency after 2009)

Members of the Parliament

Election Results

General Election 2004

General Election 1999

General Election 1998

General Election 1996

General Election 1991

General Election 1989

General election 1984

General Election 1980

General Election 1977

References

See also
 Rasipuram
 List of Constituencies of the Lok Sabha

Former Lok Sabha constituencies of Tamil Nadu
Former constituencies of the Lok Sabha
2008 disestablishments in India
Constituencies disestablished in 2008